Alexander "Sandy" Mayer (born April 5, 1952) is a former tennis player from the United States. He won twelve titles in singles and twenty-four titles in doubles in his professional career, and was part of the winning tennis squad at Stanford University in 1973.

Career

Mayer was born in Flushing, New York. He entered Stanford University in 1970. In 1972, Mayer and Roscoe Tanner won the NCAA doubles championship, and the Stanford team finished second in the NCAA tournament, behind Trinity University. 

In 1973, Mayer and Stanford won everything in the NCAA tournament: Mayer won singles, Mayer and Jim Delaney won doubles, and the team won the national championship ahead of USC.

The right-handed Mayer reached his highest singles ATP-ranking in April 1982, when he became world No. 7. His younger brother Gene was also a world tour tennis player and reached a career high of world No. 4 in 1980.

Family

Mayer has four sons and a daughter, all of whom had been previously ranked in the United States Tennis Association Junior Tennis League (Northern California Section). Mayer's wife, Libby, is a teacher.

Career finals

Singles (11 titles, 10 runner-ups)

Doubles (24 titles, 16 runner-ups)

External links
 
 

1952 births
American male tennis players
French Open champions
Living people
Sportspeople from Queens, New York
People from Portola Valley, California
American people of German descent
Stanford Cardinal men's tennis players
Tennis people from New York (state)
Grand Slam (tennis) champions in men's doubles